This is a list of licensed, active breweries in the U.S. state of Washington. In 2014, there were 281 breweries licensed by the Washington State Liquor Control Board (WSLCB), 233 of which produced at least one barrel of beer. The first American brewpub since Prohibition, Bert Grant's Yakima Brewing & Malting Co, was based in Washington.

Breweries

Breweries that were licensed in Washington and reported the taxable sale of at least one barrel of beer in 2014. The public records of licensed breweries, the number of taxed barrels of beer produced annually, and other data are from the Public Records Index of the WSLCB. Numbers in parentheses after the city indicate the brewery has more than one location in that city.

Inactive breweries
Former Washington microbreweries with Wikipedia articles.

Newly licensed

Licensed microbreweries with no production data available.
Chainline Brewing Company, Cross Kirkland Corridor, Kirkland

See also 
 Beer in the United States
 List of breweries in the United States
 List of microbreweries

References

External links
Brewers Association, Washington State directory
Washington breweries directory
Washington Beer Commission's Breweries Directory

Washington
Breweries